Iben Sandemose (born 13 July 1950) is a Norwegian illustrator, children's writer, playwright and biographer. She was born in Oslo, and is the granddaughter of Aksel Sandemose. Among her children's books is Vingemus og kattejammer from 1987, and Ringeren & Notre Madame from 1994, which was adapted for theatre and staged at Centralteatret in 1994. She was awarded Teskjekjerringprisen in 2011. She is represented with her art works at Riksgalleriet and at the National Gallery of Norway.

References

1950 births
Living people
Artists from Oslo
Norwegian illustrators
Norwegian children's writers
Norwegian dramatists and playwrights
Norwegian biographers
Norwegian women writers
Women biographers